Appleby is a suburb of New Zealand's southernmost city, Invercargill. The suburb includes Appleby Park.

Demographics
The statistical area of Crinan is within Appleby but includes only its northern half, with the rest being part of the Kew statistical area.

Crinan had a population of 1,734 at the 2018 New Zealand census, an increase of 150 people (9.5%) since the 2013 census, and an increase of 300 people (20.9%) since the 2006 census. There were 759 households. There were 909 males and 825 females, giving a sex ratio of 1.1 males per female. The median age was 32.8 years (compared with 37.4 years nationally), with 273 people (15.7%) aged under 15 years, 507 (29.2%) aged 15 to 29, 762 (43.9%) aged 30 to 64, and 195 (11.2%) aged 65 or older.

Ethnicities were 65.7% European/Pākehā, 22.0% Māori, 3.1% Pacific peoples, 19.9% Asian, and 2.2% other ethnicities (totals add to more than 100% since people could identify with multiple ethnicities).

The proportion of people born overseas was 24.0%, compared with 27.1% nationally.

Although some people objected to giving their religion, 51.0% had no religion, 30.4% were Christian, 3.1% were Hindu, 1.6% were Muslim, 0.7% were Buddhist and 5.0% had other religions.

Of those at least 15 years old, 225 (15.4%) people had a bachelor or higher degree, and 402 (27.5%) people had no formal qualifications. The median income was $19,400, compared with $31,800 nationally. 51 people (3.5%) earned over $70,000 compared to 17.2% nationally. The employment status of those at least 15 was that 543 (37.2%) people were employed full-time, 252 (17.2%) were part-time, and 111 (7.6%) were unemployed.

References

Suburbs of Invercargill